The APW Tag Team Championships were introduced on November 20, 1996, when Michael Modest and Steve Rizzono became the first to win the titles. They defeated Frank Dalton and Joe Applebaumer in the finals of an eight team tournament to win the titles.

On December 14, 2011, All Pro Wrestling announced that they had come to terms with Vendetta Pro Wrestling to recognize the Vendetta Pro Tag-Team Championship, and to have them defended in both Vendetta Pro and in APW as the "Unified" Tag Team Titles. The titles were defended for the first time in APW on January 14, 2011, as champions Greg Hernandez and Jesse Jimenez defended against APW's team of Jody Kristofferson and Dalton Frost. Since then, the APW/Vendetta Pro Unified Tag Team Champions will often wear one Vendetta Pro title belt along with one APW title belt.

This relationship came to an end in 2014 when Vendetta Pro returned to having their own set of tag belts, following this the APW would reinstate the championships.

Title history

Combined reigns 

{| class="wikitable sortable" style="text-align: center"
!Rank
!Team
!No. ofreigns
!Combineddefenses
!Combineddays
|-
!1
|Reno Scum || 3 || 10 || 860
|-
!2
| Classic Connection || 3 || 10 || 631
|-
!3
| EGO || 1 || 10 || 476
|-
!4
|style="background-color: #ffe6bd"|Warbeast † || 1 || 0 || +
|-
!5
| The Westside Playaz 2000 || 1 || 10 || 343
|-
!6
| Lion Power || 3 || 2 || 323
|-
!7
| Immortal Fear || 1 || 10 || 259
|-
!8
| Robert Thompson and Donovan Morgan || 1 || 3 || 188
|-
!9
| Bloodline || 1 || 2 || 147
|-
!10
| Boyce LeGrande and Mustafa Saed || 1 || 0 || 140
|-
!11
| The Black Armada || 1 || 2 || 126
|-
!12
| The Mafia || 2 || 1 || 111
|-
!13
| Michael Modest and Tony Jones || 1 || 3 ||84
|-
!14
| Idris Jackson and Sionne Finau || 1 || 0 || 84
|-
!15
| Ground And Pound || 1 || 0 || 70
|-
!16
| Michael Modest and Steve Rizzono || 1 || 3 || 66
|-
!17
| The Ballard Brothers || 1 || 1 || 63
|-
!18
| Vic and Dic Grimes || 1 || 0 || 62
|-
!19
| The Original Westside Playaz || 2 || 1 || 53
|-
!20
| Tony Jones and Jay Smooth || 1 || 1 || 49
|-
!21
| Boyce LeGrande and Mark Smith || 1 || 0 || 49
|-
!22
| All Pro Rangers || 1 || 2 || 42
|-
!23
| Reno Over Everything || 1 || 1 || 42
|-
!24
| Tony Jones and Steve Rizzono || 1 || 0 || 42
|-
!25
| The Murdoch Cousins || 1 || 0 || 27
|-
!26
| Robert Thompson and Chris Cole || 1 || 0 || 14
|-
!27
| Frank Murdoch and Boom-Boom Comini || 1 || 0 || 14
|-
!28
| Derek Sanders and Payton || 1 || 0 || 14
|-
!29
| The Border Patrol || 1 ||style="background-color:#bbeeff"|N/A¤ ||style="background-color:#bbeeff"|N/A¤
|-

By wrestler 
{|class="wikitable sortable" style="text-align: center"
!Rank
!Wrestler
!data-sort-type="number"|No. ofreigns
!data-sort-type="number"|Combineddefenses
!data-sort-type="number"|Combineddays	
|-
!rowspan=2|1
|Adam Thornstowe || 3 || 10 || 860
|-
|Luster The Legend || 3 || 10 || 860
|-
!rowspan=2|3
| Buddy Royal || 3 || 10 || 631
|-
| Levi Shapiro || 3 || 10 || 631
|-
!5
| Robert Thompson || 5 || 14 || 601
|-
!6
| Boyce LeGrande || 3 || 10 || 532
|-
!7
| Nathan Rulez || 2 || 10 ||style="background-color:#bbeeff"| 476¤
|-
!8
| AJ Kirsch || 1 || 10 || 476
|-
!rowspan=2|9
|style="background-color: #ffe6bd"|Jacob Fatu † || 1 || 0 || colspan=2|+
|-
|style="background-color: #ffe6bd"|Josef Samael † || 1 || 0 || colspan=2|+
|-
!11
| Billy Blade || 2 || 12 || 406
|-
!rowspan=2|12
| Marcus Lewis || 3 || 2 || 323
|-
| Will Hobbs || 3 || 2 || 323
|-
!14
| Kaden || 1 || 10 || 259
|-
!15
| Tony Jones || 5 || 5 || 231 
|-
!16
| Donovan Morgan || 1 || 3 || 188
|-
!17
| Michael Modest || 2 || 6 || 147
|-
!18
| Gangrel || 1 || 2 || 147
|-
!19
| Mustafa Saed || 1 || 0 || 140
|-
!rowspan=2|20
| Papo Esco || 1 || 2 || 126
|-
| Synn || 1 || 2 || 126
|-
!rowspan=2|22
| Chris Colione || 2 || 1 || 111
|-
| Vennis DeMarco || 2 || 1 || 111
|-
!24
| Steve Rizzono || 2 || 3 || 105
|-
!25
| Vic/Vic Murdoch || 2 || 0 || 89
|-
!rowspan=2|26
| Idris Jackson || 1 || 0 || 84
|-
| Sionne Finau || 1 || 0 || 84
|-
!rowspan=2|28
| Dana Lee || 1 || 0 || 70
|-
| Tito Aquino || 1 || 0 || 70
|-
!rowspan=2|30
| Shane Ballard || 1 || 1 || 63
|-
| Shannon Ballard || 1 || 1 || 63
|-
!32
| Dic Grimes || 1 || 0 || 62
|-
!33
| Jay Smooth || 1 || 1 || 49
|-
!34
| Mark Smith || 1 || 0 || 49
|-
!rowspan=4|35
| Kid Omega || 1 || 2 || 42
|-
| Kyu Ketsui || 1 || 2 || 42
|-
| Karl Fredericks || 1 || 1 || 42
|-
| Styker || 1 || 1 || 42
|-
!39
| Frank Murdoch || 2 || 0 || 41
|-
!40
| Derek Sanders || 2 || 0 ||style="background-color:#bbeeff"|14¤
|-
!rowspan=3|41
| Chris Cole || 1 || 0 || 14
|-
| Boom-Boom Comini || 1 || 0 || 14
|-
| Payton || 1 || 0 || 14
|-

See also
All Pro Wrestling
APW Universal Heavyweight Championship
APW Worldwide Internet Championship

References

External links
APW Tag Team Championship history on Solie.org

All Pro Wrestling championships
Tag team wrestling championships